The Horăița is a left tributary of the river Almaș in Romania. It flows into the Almaș near Dobreni.

References

Rivers of Romania
Rivers of Neamț County